Counting cards may refer to:

 Card counting, the process of counting the cards in gambling games
 Counting card (cards), those cards which have an intrinsic scoring value in card games